Hans-Peter Zwicker (born 7 April 1960 in St. Gallen, Switzerland) is a retired football striker.

During his club career, Zwicker played for SC Brühl, FC Zürich, Lausanne, FC St. Gallen and Neuchâtel Xamax FC, also representing the Swiss national team.

Honours
Neuchâtel Xamax
Swiss Super Cup: 1988

References

External links
 
 

1960 births
Living people
Swiss men's footballers
Switzerland international footballers
Association football forwards
FC Zürich players
FC Lausanne-Sport players
FC St. Gallen players
Neuchâtel Xamax FCS players
Sportspeople from St. Gallen (city)